Toby Alexander Radford (born 3 December 1971 Caerphilly, Glamorgan, Wales) is a Welsh cricket coach, former first-class cricketer and cricket administrator.

First-class career

The son of a Welsh journalist Brian Radford, Radford was born in Caerphilly, Glamorgan, and represented Middlesex (1993-1995), Sussex (1996-1997) and Berkshire (1999) as a right-handed opening batsman and an occasional off-spinner in 14 first-class matches and six List A matches. He also played for England in six Youth Tests with a personal best of 79 against New Zealand in Auckland.

Coach

Upon leaving first-class cricket, he played two full seasons for Berkshire and served the Berkshire Cricket Board as its Cricket Development Officer. After a successful spell as Director of the Middlesex Cricket Academy at Finchley, he was appointed 1st XI Coach by Middlesex on 7 November 2007. The highlight of his tenure was when Middlesex won the 2008 Twenty20 Cup.

In addition to winning the Twenty20 Cup, Radford won the Second Eleven Trophy when in charge of that team, gained promotion to the Pro40 League in his first season with the First Eleven and is recognised as having resurrected England captain Andrew Strauss' international batting career.

Radford then moved on to an elite specialist batting coach, working primarily with the ECB at their training headquarters in Loughborough.

After working for the West Indies in Barbados, Radford was appointed Head Coach at Glamorgan County Cricket Club in October 2013, taking over from Matthew Mott. He left after two years in the role on 30 December 2015.

Career best performances

References

1971 births
Living people
Welsh cricketers
Middlesex cricketers
Sussex cricketers
Berkshire cricketers
Hampshire Cricket Board cricketers
Welsh cricket administrators
Welsh cricket coaches
Glamorgan cricket coaches